The Teledyne CAE J69 was a small turbojet engine originally produced by Continental Aviation and Engineering (CAE) under license from Turbomeca. The J69 was a development of the Turbomeca Marboré II.  It powered a number of U.S. drones, missiles and small aircraft.  The engine was later produced by Teledyne CAE.  The J69 was also developed into the Teledyne CAE J100 turbojet optimized for operation at higher altitudes.

Variants
Data from:Aircraft engines of the World 1957
J69-T-1 (Marboré I)  at 23,000 rpm.
J69-T-3  at 22,500 rpm for take-off.
J69-T-6
J69-T-9
J69-T-17
J69-T-19
J69-T-19A
J69-T-19B
J69-T-23
J69-T-25
J69-T-27
J69-T-29
J69-T-31
J69-T-33
J69-T-39
J69-T-41
J69-T-41A
J69-T-406
J100-CA-100 thrust
CJ69-1025
CJ69-1400 lb thrust
Model 352
Model 352A
Model 352-5a (CJ69-T-1025)  thrust
Model 354-12 (J69-T-27)  thrust
Model 356-7A (J69-T-29)  thrust
Model 356-7D (J69-T-29)  thrust
Model 356-8 (J69-T-31)  thrust
Model 356-11 (J69-T-33)  thrust
Model 356-16
Model 356-24
Model 356-27B
Model 356-29A (J69-T-41A)

Applications

J69
 Avro Canada VZ-9 Avrocar
 Cessna T-37 Tweet
 Radioplane Q-1
 Ryan BQM-34 Firebee
 Temco TT Pinto

J100
 Ryan Model 147T

Specifications (Marboré IIC)

See also

References

External links

 Aircraft fitted with MARBORE II or VI

1950s turbojet engines
J69
Centrifugal-flow turbojet engines